Podocarpus dispermus is a species of conifer in the family Podocarpaceae known commonly as the broad-leaved brown pine. It is endemic to Queensland, Australia, where it is limited to the eastern Atherton Tableland.

This species grows in scattered subpopulations. It is part of the rainforest understory. The seed is dispersed by southern cassowary (Casuarius casuarius) and musky rat-kangaroos (Hypsiprymnodon moschatus).

References

Pinales of Australia
dispermus
Flora of Queensland
Taxonomy articles created by Polbot